Dalziel Ridge is the primary, western ridge of the Columbia Mountains in Palmer Land. There is considerable exposure of bare rock along the west slopes of the feature. It was mapped by the United States Geological Survey in 1974, and named by the Advisory Committee on Antarctic Names for Ian W.D. Dalziel, a British geologist at Columbia University, and in several seasons (late 1960s to 1976) the principal United States Antarctic Research Program investigator of the structure and petrology of the Scotia Ridge area.

See also
Bardsdell Nunatak

References
 

Ridges of Palmer Land